João Paulo Santos de Santana (26 January 1992 – 11 November 2021) was a Brazilian singer and politician. A member of multiple political parties, most recently Avante, he served in the Legislative Assembly of Bahia from 2019 to 2021.

References

1992 births
2021 deaths
Brazilian male singers
21st-century Brazilian politicians
Members of the Legislative Assembly of Bahia
Brazilian Communist Party politicians
Republican Party of the Social Order politicians
Social Christian Party (Brazil) politicians
Avante (political party) politicians